Elizabeth Sally Ward  is a British physician who is Director of Translational Immunology at the Centre for Cancer Immunology in the University of Southampton. She was elected Fellow of the Royal Society in 2022.

Early life and education 
Ward was an undergraduate student at the University of Cambridge, where she studied the Natural Sciences Tripos with a focus on biochemistry. She remained at Cambridge for her doctoral research, working under the supervision of David J. Ellar at Gonville and Caius College, Cambridge. Her PhD research investigated the genetics of delta endotoxin from Bacillus thuringiensis israelensis.

Research and career 
Ward remained at Cambridge as a junior research fellow, working in both Gonville and Caius College and Sidney Sussex College, Cambridge.

In 1990, Ward moved to the United States. She joined the University of Texas Southwestern Medical Center, where she was a member of the founding team of the Centre for Immunology. She was awarded various named chairs in Texas, including the Paul and Betty Meek-FINA Professorship. In 1996, Ward identified the Fc receptor, a regulator of Immunoglobulin G levels. She moved to the Texas A&M University Health Sciences University in 2014. In 2018, Ward returned to the United Kingdom, joining the University of Southampton as Professor of Molecular Immunology and Director of Translational Immunology.

Ward works on antibody and protein engineering to treat autoimmune disease. She makes use of in vivo studies to design novel anti-body therapies for the treatment of cancer. Her early identification of the Fc receptor has resulted in the development of FcRn antagonist technologies. Ward has licensed these Abdegs (antibodies that enhance IgG degradation) to the pharmaceutical industry, resulting in anti-body therapeutics.

Ward has developed advanced microscopies and image analysis techniques. She has demonstrated single molecule spectroscopy is capable of imaging single protein molecules at exceptional resolution. She uses multi-colour imaging to interrogate the cell surfaces. Using these approaches, Ward visualised the biological pathways intracellular endoscopes to the plasma membrane (and vice versa). She has also pioneered open access software packages for miroscopy analysis.

Awards and honours 
 2018 Royal Society Wolfson Research Merit Award
 2020 Elected Vice President of the Antibody Society
 2022 Elected Fellow of the Royal Society

Selected publications 
 Binding activities of a repertoire of single immunoglobulin variable domains secreted from Escherichia coli
 Localization accuracy in single-molecule microscopy"
 Multiple roles for the major histocompatibility complex class I- related receptor FcRn
 Differences in promiscuity for antibody–FcRn interactions across species: implications for therapeutic antibodies

References 

Living people
British biochemists
Fellows of the Royal Society
Alumni of Gonville and Caius College, Cambridge
Academics of the University of Southampton
Royal Society Wolfson Research Merit Award holders
20th-century British scientists
Year of birth missing (living people)